Nancy Linari is an American voice, film and television actress. She also has recurring roles on Duckman, W.I.T.C.H., The Real Adventures of Jonny Quest, and has guest starred on a number of other TV shows like Two and a Half Men. Linari also provided the voice of Morticia Addams on The Addams Family. Most recently, she played the secretary of Harvard University president Lawrence Summers in The Social Network, and Martha Barriga in Steven Universe. Recently, she voiced May Parker in the 2017 Spider-Man TV series and reprised the same role in the video game in 2018.

Filmography

Live-action roles

Animation roles

Video game roles

References

External links

Living people
American voice actresses
Place of birth missing (living people)
Year of birth missing (living people)
21st-century American women